Gregory Pardlo (born November 24, 1968) is an American poet, writer, and professor. His book Digest won the 2015 Pulitzer Prize for Poetry. His poems, reviews, and translations have appeared in The American Poetry Review, Callaloo, Poet Lore, Harvard Review, Ploughshares, and on National Public Radio. His work has been praised for its “language simultaneously urban and highbrow… snapshots of a life that is so specific it becomes universal.”

Life and work

Pardlo's first volume of poems, Totem, was chosen by Brenda Hillman as the winner of the 2007 American Poetry Review / Honickman First Book Prize, distributed by Copper Canyon Press. The manuscript for Totem was also a semifinalist for the Walt Whitman Award from the Academy of American Poets, a finalist for the National Poetry Series, and a finalist for the inaugural Essence Magazine Literary Award in Poetry. Pardlo is the translator of the full-length poetry collection Pencil of Rays and Spike Mace by Danish poet Niels Lyngsø.

Born in Philadelphia, Pardlo grew up in Willingboro, New Jersey. His younger brother is Robbie Pardlo, an American musician formerly of R&B group City High. His father, Gregory Pardlo Sr., is a former air traffic controller who participated in the air traffic controllers' strike of 1981.

Gregory Pardlo received his BA in English from Rutgers University-Camden, an MFA from New York University as a New York Times Fellow in Poetry, and an MFA in nonfiction from Columbia University; he is also a doctoral candidate in English at the City University of New York. He has been the recipient of fellowships from the John Simon Guggenheim Memorial Foundation, the New York Foundation for the Arts, the Cave Canem Foundation, the MacDowell Artist's Colony, the Seaside Institute, the Lotos Club Foundation, and City University of New York, as well as a translation grant from the National Endowment for the Arts.

Pardlo's poem “Written by Himself” appeared in The Best American Poetry 2010 anthology series edited by David Lehman and Amy Gerstler, following initial publication in The American Poetry Review. His poem "Wishing Well" appeared in The Best American Poetry 2014, guest edited by Terrance Hayes, following initial publication in Painted Bride Quarterly.
Pardlo serves as an Associate Editor for the literary journal Callaloo. He has led writing workshops for the PEN American Center, American Poetry Review / Young Voices Program, The Frost Place Conference, Callaloo Creative Writer's Workshop, and Jamaica’s Calabash International Literary Festival, among others. He is a Teaching Fellow at Columbia University.

In 2016, Pardlo accepted a tenure-track faculty position with the English department at his alma mater, Rutgers University-Camden. He has previously taught at Columbia University, George Washington University, Medgar Evers College, The New School University, John Jay College, Hunter College, and NYU.

Awards and honors 
 2015 Winner, Pulitzer Prize for poetry for Digest
 2014 Selection, The Best American Poetry 2014 for "Wishing Well"
 2010 Selection, The Best American Poetry 2010 for "Written by Himself"
 2008 Finalist, Essence Magazine Literary Award in Poetry for Totem
 2008 Selection, Coldfront Magazine Best First Books of 2007 for Totem
 2008 Nominee, Pushcart Prize
 2007 Winner, American Poetry Review / Honickman First Book Prize in Poetry for Totem
 2007 Finalist, National Poetry Series for Totem
 2007 Semifinalist, Academy of American Poets Walt Whitman Award for Totem
 2005 Finalist, Cave Cavem Book Prize
 2004 Winner, Lotos Club Foundation Award for Creative Writing
 2003 Nominee, Pushcart Prize
 2001 Honorable Mention, New Millennium Writings Prize

Published works

Full-length poetry collections 
 Totem (Copper Canyon Press, 2007), 
 Digest (Four Way Books, 2014),

Memoir
Air Traffic: A Memoir of Ambition and Manhood in America (Knopf, 2018),

Translations 
 Pencil of Rays and Spiked Mace (from the Danish of Niels Lyngsø; BookThug, 2004),

Anthologized writings 
 “Written by Himself”, The Best American Poetry 2010 (Scribner, 2010)
 “Marginalia”, So Much Things to Say: 100 Poets from the First Ten Years of the Calabash International Literary Festival (Akashic Books, 2010)
 “Double Dutch”, From the Fishouse: An Anthology of Poems that Sing, Rhyme, Resound, Syncopate, Alliterate, and Just Plain Sound Great (Persea Press, 2009)
“Man Reading in Bed by a Window with Bugs”, Black Nature: Four Centuries of African American Nature Poetry (University of Georgia Press, 2009)
“Winter After the Strike”, Gathering Ground: A Reader Celebrating Cave Canem’s First Decade (University of Michigan Press, 2006)
 “Arsonist” and “Future as Evaporation”, Role Call: A Generational Anthology of Social and Political Black Literature and Art (Third World Press, 2002)
 “Harvest: A Line Drawing”, Bum Rush the Page: A Def Poetry Jam (Three Rivers Press, 2001)

Selected prose 
 “Revisiting the Racial Mountain” (PEN American Center, 2010)
 “A Way of No Way: Toward Constructing a Black Male Poetic” (Painted Bride Quarterly #75, 2006)
 "'Hurrah for Schoelcher!'" (Drunken Boat 20, 2014)

References

External links 

 Gregory Pardlo website
 Tammy Paolino, "Poems, perspective and a Pulitzer", Courier-Post, June 12, 2015
 Erica Wright, "Gregory Pardlo: The Poem as Pursuit" (interview), Guernica, March 10, 2015
 Gregory Pardlo on Totem, CUNY Radio podcast
 Interview: Poem Of The Week
 "An Awe-Inspiring Evening with Greg Pardlo", GWU English News, Department of English, George Washington University
 "Introducing Gregory Pardlo", GWU English News
 Audio: Poems & Discussion, From the Fishouse: an audio archive of emerging poets
 Audio: Poets.org
 Three Poems, The Awl
 "Gregpry Pardlo: How to pretend you've read a book you haven't", Literary Hub, April 11, 2018

1968 births
Living people
American male poets
Writers from Philadelphia
People from Willingboro Township, New Jersey
Columbia University School of the Arts alumni
New York University alumni
Rutgers University alumni
Graduate Center, CUNY alumni
Pulitzer Prize for Poetry winners
21st-century American poets
Poets from Pennsylvania
Poets from New Jersey
George Washington University faculty
Medgar Evers College faculty
The New School faculty
John Jay College of Criminal Justice faculty
Hunter College faculty
New York University faculty
Columbia University faculty
21st-century American translators
Danish–English translators
21st-century American male writers